Alexander Carlisle Buchanan (23 December 1808 – 2 February 1868) was an Irishman appointed by Britain to serve as the Chief Agent for Emigration in Quebec, Lower Canada in 1828. Buchanan himself advised the British authorities to appoint only Canadians as emigration agents, not as immigration officers, to ensure that the administration (of immigration to the colony from the mother country) was "free from local prejudice".

References

External links
 Moving Here, Staying Here: The Canadian Immigrant Experience at Library and Archives Canada

19th-century Canadian civil servants
1808 births
1868 deaths
Irish emigrants to Canada
People from Omagh